Minuscule 568 (in the Gregory-Aland numbering), ε 189 (in the Soden numbering), is a Greek minuscule manuscript of the New Testament, on parchment. Palaeographically it has been assigned to the 10th century.

Description 

The codex contains a complete text of the four Gospels on 259 parchment leaves (size ). It has ornamented head-pieces. The writing is in one column per page, 24 lines per page.

There is also a division according to the smaller Ammonian Sections, with references to the Eusebian Canons.

It contains Epistula ad Carpianum, the Eusebian tables, tables of the  before every Gospel, Synaxarion, Menologion, and pictures.

Text 

The Greek text of the codex is a representative of the Byzantine text-type. Hermann von Soden classified it to the Kak (with hesitation). Aland placed it in Category V.
According to the Claremont Profile Method it represents the textual family Kx in Luke 1, Luke 10, and Luke 20.

History 

The manuscript was presented by consul of Syra, Sandrinus. In  1851 it was donated to the Imperial Public Library in Petersburg by Sandrini, the consul of the Syros Island.

The manuscripts was examined and described by Eduard de Muralt (along with the codices 565-566, 569-572, 574, 575, and 1567), then by Kurt Treu.

Scrivener labelled it by 879,
Gregory by 568.

Currently the manuscript is housed at the Russian National Library (Gr. 67) in Saint Petersburg.

See also 

 List of New Testament minuscules
 Biblical manuscript
 Textual criticism

References

Further reading 

 Eduard de Muralt, Catalogue des manuscrits grecs de la Bibliothèque Impériale publique (Petersburg 1864).
 Kurt Treu, Die griechischen Handschriften des Neuen Testaments in der UdSSR; eine systematische Auswertung des Texthandschriften in Leningrad, Moskau, Kiev, Odessa, Tbiblisi und Erevan, Texte und Untersuchungen 91 (Berlin, 1966), pp. 50–53.

External links 
 Minuscule 568 at the Russian national Library

Greek New Testament minuscules
10th-century biblical manuscripts
National Library of Russia collection